The  is an electric multiple unit (EMU) train type operated by Fukuoka City Transportation Bureau on the Hakozaki Line and Kūkō Line subway lines in Fukuoka, Japan, since 1993.

Renewals have been carried out sequentially since 2021, and the updated cars have been changed to 2000N series.

Operations
The fleet of six 6-car 2000 series trains are based at  depot and are used alongside the Fukuoka Subway 1000 series on the Hakozaki Line and Kūkō Line subway lines, and also through-running services to and from the Chikuhi Line owned by Kyushu Railway Company (JR Kyushu).

Design
The trains have stainless steel bodies. The longitudinal seats are covered with a green moquette.

Formations
As of 1 April 2014, the fleet consists of six 6-car sets consisting of four motored ("M") cars and two non-powered trailer ("T") cars, formed as shown below with car 1 at the Meinohama end.

 Cars 3 and 5 each have two cross-arm pantographs.
 Car 5 is designated as a mildly air-conditioned car.

History
The 2000 series was introduced in 1993.

A refurbishment program was carried out on all six 2000 series sets between 2015 and 2017. The destination signs were replaced with multilingual four-color destination signs and the interior seating arrangement was changed.

After that, the 2000N series, which has been renewed mainly underfloor equipment and interior decoration of the main circuit equipment and auxiliary power supply equipment, has completed all renovation work, has started operating on January 7, 2021.

References

External links

 Official website (archived on 19 December 2012) 
•official website(2000N series)
 official website(2000 series)
 福岡市交通局2000系 - NIPPON SHARYO, LTD

2000 series
Electric multiple units of Japan
Train-related introductions in 1993
Kawasaki multiple units
Kinki Sharyo multiple units
Nippon Sharyo multiple units
1500 V DC multiple units of Japan